Rudolf Hermann Brandt (2 June 1909 – 2 June 1948) was a German SS officer from 1933–45 and a civil servant.  A lawyer by profession, Brandt was the Personal Administrative Officer to Reichsführer-SS (Persönlicher Referent vom Reichsführer SS) Heinrich Himmler and a defendant at the Doctors' Trial at Nuremberg for his part in securing the 86 victims of the Jewish skull collection, an attempt to create an anthropological display of plaster body casts and skeletal remains of Jews. He was convicted of war crimes and crimes against humanity, and executed in 1948. Felix Kersten, a Finnish doctor who reportedly saved thousands of Jews by influencing Himmler during the massage therapy he gave him throughout the war, tried to save Brandt from execution, as Brandt helped him by adding names on the lists intended to save camp prisoners.

Life and work
Rudolf Brandt, the son of a railway worker, was born on 2 June 1909, and raised in modest circumstances in the town of Frankfurt an der Oder. Brandt was a member of the student's stenography (shorthand) club at the Realgymnasium, and in 1927, at the age of 18, won a competition with a transcription speed of 360 syllables per minute. He attended the University of Berlin and the University of Jena (1928–1932), simultaneously working from 1928 to 1930 as a court reporter at the Provisional National Economic Council. Brandt would continue to practice stenography in the evenings with his colleague and former Frankfurt schoolmate Gerhard Herrgesell.

Brandt was awarded a doctorate of law from the University of Jena in July 1933.  He joined the Nazi Party in January 1932 (membership number 1,331,536) and the SS in October 1933 (membership number 129,771).  Brandt and his skills in transcription were noticed by Heinrich Himmler, who had him transferred to his staff.  On 11 December 1933, he joined the Staff of Reichsführer-SS Himmler in the capacity of clerk.  In November 1935, he was commissioned an Untersturmführer (second lieutenant) and ultimately rose to the rank of Standartenführer (colonel).

In 1936, Brandt was named Chief of the Personal Staff of the Reichsführer-SS (Leiter des Persönlichen Stabes RFSS), and in 1937, Persönlicher Referent des RFSS, a position he held until the end of the war in May 1945.  In this position Brandt handled Himmler's entire correspondence with the exception of matters pertaining to the Waffen-SS or the Police.

Walter Schellenberg, the Ausland-SD department chief who reported directly to Himmler, said of Brandt:

In 1938 or 1939, Brandt became Himmler's liaison officer to the Reich Ministry of the Interior and particularly to the Office Secretary of the Interior.  In 1943, when Himmler became Minister of the Interior, Brandt was Ministerial Councilor and Head of the Minister's Office in the Reich Ministry of the Interior.  Brandt was also a member of the Ahnenerbe society, of which Himmler was President.  On account of his position, Brandt was also the liaison officer to the Reich Secretary of the Ahnenerbe Society, Wolfram Sievers.

Brandt was briefly absent from Himmler's office, from 30 March 1941 to 11 May 1941.  During this time he fought with the Artillery Regiment of the 1st SS Panzer Division Leibstandarte SS Adolf Hitler in the campaign against Greece.

Jewish skull collection
Originally the "specimens" to be used in the collection were to be Jewish commisars in the Red Army captured on the Eastern front by the Wehrmacht. The individuals ultimately chosen for the collection were obtained from among a pool of 115 Jewish inmates at Auschwitz concentration camp in Occupied Poland. They were chosen for their perceived stereotypical racial characteristics. The initial selections were carried out by SS-Hauptsturmführer Dr. Bruno Beger and Dr. Hans Fleischhacker, who arrived in Auschwitz in the first half of 1943 and finished the preliminary work by 15 June 1943.

Due to a typhus epidemic at Auschwitz, the candidates chosen for the skull collection were quarantined in order to prevent them from becoming ill and ruining their value as anatomical specimens. In February 1942, Sievers submitted to Himmler, through Rudolf Brandt, a report from which the following is an extract read at the Nuremberg Doctors Trial by General Telford Taylor, Chief Counsel for the prosecution at Nuremberg:'End of the war
In August 1944, Brandt informed Standartenführer Guntram Pflaum, whom Himmler had appointed head of pest control, of Himmler's desire to create a "Fly and Gnat Room", where "all SS leaders and police who are either uninterested in the nuisance created by flies or even dismiss it with a superior smile will find they will be taken into care there for some considerable time, during which they will have the opportunity to study the question of flies and gnats from a theoretical angle as well as to enjoy the attentions of the hundreds and thousands of flies and gnats in the room itself."

Brandt was a member of the entourage which accompanied Himmler into hiding, leaving Flensberg on 10 May 1945, with the goal of reaching Bavaria. He became separated from Himmler and surrendered along with half of the six-man group to British troops on 21 May. On the same day, Himmler and his two aides Werner Grothmann and Heinz Macher were stopped and detained at a checkpoint set up by former Soviet POWs. On 23 May Himmler was brought to the British 31st Civilian Interrogation Camp near Lüneburg.

Brandt watched from inside the wire of the detention camp when Himmler was brought in. Himmler identified himself to the duty officer, Captain Thomas Selvester. Himmler was then taken to the headquarters of the Second British Army in Lüneburg, where during a medical exam he committed suicide by biting down on a hidden cyanide ampule.

Trial and execution
Rudolf Brandt was indicted after the war by the US Military Tribunal, on charges of:
 Conspiracy to commit war crimes and crimes against humanity;
 War crimes, to wit performing medical experiments without the subjects' consent on prisoners of war and civilians of occupied countries, as well as participation in the mass-murder of concentration camp inmates;
 Crimes against humanity: committing crimes described under count 2 also on German nationals; and
 Membership in a criminal organization, the SS.

Brandt, in common with most of the defendants at the Doctor's Trial, was acquitted on the first count as the Tribunal felt that it fell outside their jurisdiction.

He was found guilty on the other three counts, as he had been responsible for the administration and coordination of the experiments at the camps. He was hanged on 2 June 1948, his 39th birthday.

References

Citations

Bibliography
"Medical Case Tribunal Nuremberg Indictment" at www.ess.uwe.ac.uk
 Fragebogen zur Erlangung der Verlobungsgenehmigung; RS-Akte, BArch.-Berlin.
 Trial Transcript Citation: Trial Name: NMT 01. Medical Case - USA v. Karl Brandt, et al., English Transcript: p. 10321 (28 June 1947) Gerhard Herrgesell (Judge of local court).
 Trial Transcript Citation: Trial Name: NMT 01. Medical Case - USA v. Karl Brandt, et al., English Transcript: p. 4997 (26 March 1947) Luitpold Schallermeier (assistant to Karl Wolff in Himmler's office, Waffen SS).
 Trial Transcript Citation: Trial Name: NMT 01. Medical Case - USA v. Karl Brandt, et al., English Transcript: p. 10321 (28 June 1947) Sepp Tiefenbacher (friend of Rudolf Brandt).
 Trial Transcript Citation: Trial Name: NMT 01. Medical Case - USA v. Karl Brandt, et al., English Transcript: p. 4828 (21 March 1947) p. 4997 (26 March 1947) Walter Schellenberg (Gestapo, RSHA; Brigade-Fuehrer, Waffen SS).
 Ernst Klee, Das Personenlexikon zum Dritten Reich. Wer war was vor und nach 1945, Frankfurt am Main 2005, S. 71.
 
 Schellenberg, Walter (2000) [1956]. The Labyrinth: Memoirs Of Walter Schellenberg, Hitler's Chief Of Counterintelligence'', translated by Louis Hagen. Da Capo Press. 

1909 births
1948 deaths
Holocaust perpetrators in Poland
Executions by the United States Nuremberg Military Tribunals
SS-Standartenführer
Executed people from Brandenburg
Personal staff of Heinrich Himmler
German people convicted of crimes against humanity
Lawyers in the Nazi Party
Jurists from Brandenburg
People from the Province of Brandenburg
Humboldt University of Berlin alumni
University of Jena alumni
Executed mass murderers